This is the results breakdown of the local elections held in Andalusia on 25 May 2003. The following tables show detailed results in the autonomous community's most populous municipalities, sorted alphabetically.

Overall

City control
The following table lists party control in the most populous municipalities, including provincial capitals (shown in bold). Gains for a party are displayed with the cell's background shaded in that party's colour.

Municipalities

Alcalá de Guadaíra
Population: 58,351

Algeciras
Population: 106,710

Almería
Population: 173,338

Antequera
Population: 41,197

Benalmádena
Population: 35,946

Cádiz
Population: 136,236

Chiclana de la Frontera
Population: 63,719

Córdoba
Population: 314,805

Dos Hermanas
Population: 103,282

Écija
Population: 37,900

El Ejido
Population: 57,063

El Puerto de Santa María
Population: 77,747

Fuengirola
Population: 53,270

Granada
Population: 240,522

Huelva
Population: 140,862

Jaén
Population: 112,921

Jerez de la Frontera
Population: 187,087

La Línea de la Concepción
Population: 60,951

Linares
Population: 57,800

Málaga
Population: 535,686

Marbella
Population: 115,871

Morón de la Frontera
Population: 27,786

Motril
Population: 51,928

Ronda
Population: 34,470

San Fernando
Population: 88,333

Sanlúcar de Barrameda
Population: 61,908

Seville

Population: 704,114

Utrera
Population: 45,947

Vélez-Málaga
Population: 57,457

Notes

References

Andalusia
2003